Adam Nevill (also known as Adam LG Nevill) is an English writer of supernatural horror, known for his book The Ritual. Prior to becoming a full-time author, Nevill worked as an editor.

After publishing several novels through Pan Macmillan and St. Martin's, Nevill chose to self-publish his 2019 novel The Reddening. Nevill stated that his reasons were both financial and creative, as he wanted more freedom in how he could market and package his works. The novel was published under his imprint, Ritual Limited, which he created in 2016.

Bibliography

Novels
Banquet for the Damned (2004 - PS Publishing, 2008 - Virgin Books)
Apartment 16 (2010, UK - Pan)
The Ritual (2011, UK - Pan, 2012, US - St. Martin's)
Last Days (2012, UK -  Pan,  2013, US - St. Martin's)
House of Small Shadows (2013, UK -  Pan, 2014, US - St. Martin's)
No One Gets Out Alive (2014, UK -  Pan, 2015, US - St. Martin's)
Lost Girl (2015, UK -  Pan)
Under a Watchful Eye (2017, UK - Pan Macmillan)
The Reddening (2019)
Cunning Folk (2021)
The Vessel (2022)

Collections 
 Some Will Not Sleep: Selected Horrors (2016, UK and US - Ritual Limited)
 Cries from the Crypt: Selected Writings (2016, newsletter exclusive release - Ritual Limited)
 Before You Sleep: Three Terrors (2016, free eBook - Ritual Limited)
 Hasty for the Dark: Selected Horrors (2017, Ritual Limited)
 Wyrd and Other Derelictions (2020, Ritual Limited)

Short stories
"Mothers Milk" (2004, published in Gathering the Bones)
"Where Angels Come In" (2005, first published in Poe’s Progeny)
"The Original Occupant" (2005, published in Bernie Herrmann's Manic Sextet)
"Yellow Teeth" (2009, published in The British Invasion)
"The Ancestors" (2009, published in The British Fantasy Society Yearbook 2009)
"To Forget or Be Forgotten" (2009, published in Exotic Gothic 3)
"Estrus" (2010, published in Raw Terror)
"On All London Underground Lines" (2010, published in The End of the Line)
"Florrie" (2011, published in House of Fear)
"Little Mag’s Barrow" (2011, published in Terror Tales of the Lake District)
"What God Hath Wrought?" (2011, published in Gutshot)
"The Age of Entitlement" (2012, published in Dark Currents)
"Pig Thing" (2012, first published in Exotic Gothic 4)
"The Angels of London" (2013, published in Terror Tales of London)
"Always in our Hearts" (2013, published in End of the Road)
"Doll Hands" (2014, first published in The Burning Circus)
"Hippocampus" (2016, first published in Terror Tales of the Sea)
"Call the Name" (2016, first published in The Gods of H.P. Lovecraft)
"The Days of Our Lives" (2016, first published in Dead Letters)
"White Light, White Heat" (2016, first published in Marked to Die)

Awards
August Derleth Award for Best Horror Novel for Apartment 16 (2011, nominated)
August Derleth Award for Best Horror Novel for The Ritual (2012, won)
August Derleth Award for Best Horror Novel for Last Days (2013, won)
The Reference and User Services Association Reading List- Horror for The Ritual (2013, won)
August Derleth Award for Best Horror Novel for House of Small Shadows (2014, nominated)
The Reference and User Services Association Reading List- Horror for Last Days (2014, won)
August Derleth Award for Best Horror Novel for No One Gets Out Alive (2015, won)
August Derleth Award for Best Horror Novel for Lost Girl (2016, nominated)
August Derleth Award for Best Horror Novel for Under a Watchful Eye (2017, nominated)
Locus Recommended Reading List for Under a Watchful Eye (2017)
August Derleth Award for Best Horror Novel for The Reddening (2020, won)

References

External links
 
 
 The story behind Apartment 16 - Online Essay by Adam Nevill on Upcoming4.me

English horror writers
1969 births
People from Birmingham, West Midlands
Living people
English male novelists